Ambohidronono is a rural commune in Madagascar. It belongs to the district of Moramanga, which is a part of Alaotra-Mangoro Region. The population of the commune was 13,206 in 2018.

Primary and junior level secondary education are available in town. The majority 98% of the population of the commune are farmers.  The most important crops are rice and beans, while other important agricultural products are bananas, maize and cassava.  Services provide employment for 2% of the population.

References and notes 

Populated places in Alaotra-Mangoro